Marcel Grifnée (born 7 February 1947) is a former Belgian cyclist. He competed in the team time trial at the 1968 Summer Olympics.

References

External links
 

1947 births
Living people
Belgian male cyclists
Olympic cyclists of Belgium
Cyclists at the 1968 Summer Olympics
Sportspeople from Liège
Cyclists from Liège Province
20th-century Belgian people